The 1932 United States Senate election in Louisiana was held on November 8, 1932.  Incumbent Democratic Senator Edwin Broussard ran for a third term in office, but was defeated in the primary by U.S. Representative John H. Overton.

On September 13, Overton won the Democratic primary with 61.64% of the vote. 

At this time, Louisiana was a one-party state (no other party had run a candidate for Senate since the passage of the Seventeenth Amendment), and the Democratic nomination was tantamount to victory. Overton won the November general election without an opponent.

Democratic primary

Candidates
Edwin S. Broussard, incumbent Senator
John H. Overton, U.S. Representative from Marksville

Results

General election

References

1932
Louisiana
United States Senate
Single-candidate elections